Luis Grill Prieto (1928 – 21 April 2011), was an Argentine-born Chilean football player and manager who worked in Chile, Guatemala and Mexico.

Career
Born in 1928, he played football in Chile as a defender for both Universidad Católica  and Santiago Morning in the 1940s and the 1950s. In Universidad Católica, he played alongside players such as Sergio Livingstone, Rodolfo Almeyda, Andrés Prieto, among others.

He graduated as a football manager in Santiago, Chile, and coached Universidad Católica.

He came to Guatemala in 1963 to lead Municipal, becoming the first Chilean who has coached it before Jaime Hormazábal, Javier Mascaró, Rolando Torino and Fernando Díaz. During his stints with Municipal, he led the team in thirteen derbies against Comunicaciones and won two league titles in 1963–64 and 1969–70.

In Mexico, he coached León, América, Veracruz, Atlético Potosino and Tecos. With León, he won the 1966–67 Copa México and with Atlético Potosino, he was in three stints: 1973–74, 1977 and 1982–83.

His last works were as coach of the youth ranks of both Municipal and Comunicaciones.

Personal life
He naturalized Chilean by residence.

Despite he had family in Guadalajara, Mexico, after coaching Tecos FC, he made his home in Guatemala and died at the age of 83 due to intestinal issues.

Honours
Municipal
 Liga Nacional (2): , 
 Copa de Guatemala (2): 1967, 1969

León
 Copa México (1):

Legacy
Grill Prieto is considered as the discoverer of important Guatemalan players such as Carlos Ruiz, Gonzalo Romero, Marco Ciani, among others.

After his death, Comunicaciones FC started the Copa Luis Grill Prieto in his honor, a friendly match where the club showed the squad for each season. The cup was played three times in 2011, 2012 and 2013 and Comunicaciones won the first two editions.

References

1928 births
2011 deaths
Argentine football managers
Argentine footballers
Club Deportivo Universidad Católica footballers
Santiago Morning footballers
Chilean Primera División players
Argentine expatriate sportspeople in Chile
Expatriate footballers in Chile
Association football defenders
Argentine emigrants to Chile
Naturalized citizens of Chile
Chilean football managers
Club Deportivo Universidad Católica managers
C.S.D. Municipal managers
Club León managers
Club América managers
C.D. Veracruz managers
Comunicaciones F.C. managers
Tecos F.C. managers
Liga MX managers
Argentine expatriate football managers
Chilean expatriate football managers
Argentine expatriate sportspeople in Guatemala
Argentine expatriate sportspeople in Mexico
Chilean expatriate sportspeople in Guatemala
Chilean expatriate sportspeople in Mexico
Expatriate football managers in Chile
Expatriate football managers in Guatemala
Expatriate football managers in Mexico
Place of birth missing